Worlds Apart is an album by the German Progressive/Power Metal band Horizon.

Track listing

Personnel
Patrick Hemer: guitars, bass, keyboards, lead and background vocals
J.P. “Giam” Giraldi : keyboards
Krissy Friedrich: drums and background vocals

References

2004 albums
Horizon (band) albums
Massacre Records albums

fr:Worlds Apart (album)
it:Worlds Apart (album)